The High Sign/One Week: Music for the Films of Buster Keaton is an album by the guitarist Bill Frisell, released on the Elektra Nonesuch label. It was released in 1995 and features performances by Frisell, bassist Kermit Driscoll and drummer Joey Baron. The album is designed as accompaniment to Buster Keaton's first two silent film classics, The High Sign (1921) (tracks 1-9) and One Week (1920) (tracks 10-19). It was released at the same time as another album by Frisell of Keaton soundtracks,  Go West: Music for the Films of Buster Keaton (1995).

Reception
The AllMusic review by JT Griffith stated: "These rich narrative accompaniments are essential for students of film music and evangelists of the power of the score to enrich and enlighten visual art.".

Track listing
All compositions by Bill Frisell.
 "Introduction" – 0:37
 "The High Sign Theme/Help Wanted" – 0:42
 "Target Practice" – 1:16
 "The Blinking Buzzards" – 1:06
 "Good Shot/Swearing In/Shooting Gallery" – 2:30
 "Chase/Cop" (5:43)
 "The High Sign Theme/At The Home Of August Nickelnurser" – 1:10
 "Chase/Caught" – 3:21
 "The High Sign Theme" – 1:56
 "One Week Theme/The Wedding" – 0:27
 "Reckless Driving" – 1:39
 "Construction" – 0:49
 "Oh, Well/The Piano" – 1:42
 "Fight" – 5:12
 "Oh, Well/Bath Scene" – 2:05
 "Housewarming Party and Storm" – 2:52
 "One Week Theme/Aftermath" – 2:19
 "Here Comes The Train" – 0:44
 "Oh, Well" – 0:49

Personnel
Bill Frisell – acoustic and electric guitars
Kermit Driscoll – acoustic and electric basses
Joey Baron – drums and percussion

References 

1995 albums
Bill Frisell albums
Nonesuch Records albums